In architecture, an engaged column is a column embedded in a wall and partly projecting from the surface of the wall, sometimes defined as semi- or three-quarter detached. Engaged columns are rarely found in classical Greek architecture, and then only in exceptional cases, but in Roman architecture they exist in abundance, most commonly embedded in the cella walls of pseudoperipteral buildings.

In the temples it is attached to the cella walls, repeating the columns of the peristyle, and in the theatres and amphitheatres, where they subdivided the arched openings: in all these cases engaged columns are utilized as a decorative feature, and as a rule the same proportions are maintained as if they had been isolated columns. In Romanesque work the classic proportions were no longer adhered to; the engaged column, attached to the piers, has always a special function to perform, either to support subsidiary arches, or, raised to the vault, to carry its transverse or diagonal ribs. The same constructional object is followed in the earlier Gothic styles, in which they become merged into the mouldings. Being virtually always ready made, so far as their design is concerned, they were much affected by the Italian revivalists.

Gallery

See also
 Hexastyle
 Hypostyle
 Octastyle
 Peristyle
 Pilaster
 Portico
 Tetrastyle

References

 Stierlin, Henri The Roman Empire: From the Etruscans to the Decline of the Roman Empire, TASCHEN, 2002

Columns and entablature